Periyar is a 2007 Indian Tamil-language biographical film, made about the life of the social reformer and rationalist Periyar E. V. Ramasamy with Sathyaraj who himself is a rationalist in the lead role. This movie was partly funded by the then Tamil Nadu government headed by Karunanidhi. The film was dubbed in Telugu and released as Periyar Ramaswamy Naicker.

Plot
The film details the life of Periyar right from childhood to his marriage to Nagammal to his pilgrimage  to Kashi which changed his life where he understands the cruelty of the Caste System that only Brahmins are welcomed and he was refused meals at choultries which exclusively fed Brahmins forbidding other Hindu castes. Having starved severely, Periyar found no other better way than to enter a choultry disguises himself with the appearance of a Brahmin wearing a thread on his bare chest but it is found out and is disgusted with life in Kashi. Periyar returns and joins his father's business and later becomes the Chairman of the Erode Municipality. Later, which he resigns from this post and joins the freedom struggle. He becomes the President of Congress party of Madras Presidency. Later he quits the Congress party and joins the Justice Party. He goes on to form the DK. His role in the Anti-Hindi agitation and Vaikom struggle. His second marriage and the formation of the DMK. It covers his entire life till death.

Cast

Sathyaraj as Periyar E. V. Ramasamy
Chandrasekhar as Ramanathan, Periyar's friend
Jyothirmayi as Nagammai
Khushbu Sundar as Maniammai
Manorama as Chinnathayamma, Ramasamy's mother
Kaikala Satyanarayana as Venkatappa Nayakkar, Ramasamy's father
S. S. Stanley as C. N. Annadurai
Mohan Ram as B. R. Ambedkar
Vasu Vikram as M. R. Radha
Vijay Adhiraj as K. Veeramani
Vennira Aadai Nirmala as Moovalur Ramamirtham
Swarnamalya as a Thanjavur Dancer
Typist Gopu as a reporter
Madhan Bob as a musician performing Kathakalakshepam 
 Lavanya
Nizhalgal Ravi
Ajay Rathnam
Ilavarasu

Production
The film's budget was funded by ₹95 lakh (worth ₹3.9 crore in 2021 prices) grant by Government of Tamil Nadu.

Music
The music for the film has been scored by Vidyasagar.

See also
Kamaraj (film)
Bharathi (2000 film)

References

External links
CM Speaks At Periyar Function
 

2007 films
2000s Tamil-language films
Indian films based on actual events
Indian biographical films
Films shot in Tiruchirappalli
Films scored by Vidyasagar
Films set in Tiruchirappalli
Cultural depictions of B. R. Ambedkar
Best Tamil Feature Film National Film Award winners
2000s biographical films
Periyar E. V. Ramasamy
Films directed by Gnana Rajasekaran